The 2012 Seguros Bolívar Open Bucaramanga was a professional tennis tournament played on clay courts. It was the fourth edition of the tournament which was part of the 2012 ATP Challenger Tour. It took place in Bucaramanga, Colombia between 23 and 29 January 2012.

ATP entrants

Seeds

 Rankings are as of January 16, 2012.

Other entrants
The following players received wildcards into the singles main draw:
  Juan Sebastián Gómez
  Máximo González
  Felipe Mantilla
  Matías Sborowitz

The following players received entry from the qualifying draw:
  Thiago Alves
  Duilio Beretta
  Mauricio Echazú
  Marco Trungelliti

Champions

Singles

 Wayne Odesnik def.  Adrian Ungur 6–1, 7–6(7–4)

Doubles

 Ariel Behar /  Horacio Zeballos def.  Miguel Ángel López Jaén /  Paolo Lorenzi, 6–4, 7–6(7–5)

External links
Official Website
ITF Search
ATP official site

Seguros Bolivar Open Bucaramanga
Seguros Bolívar Open Bucaramanga
2012 in Colombian tennis